Albert Khuseinovich Tumenov (born December 26, 1991) is a Russian professional mixed martial artist and former amateur boxer. Tumenov competes in the welterweight division of the Absolute Championship Berkut where he is the two time ACA Welterweight Champion. A professional competitor since 2010, Tumenov has also competed in the Ultimate Fighting Championship (UFC). He is ranked #1 in the ACA welterweight rankings.

Mixed martial arts career

Early career
With the help of his father, Tumenov began training in karate and boxing at age 6. After 5 years of training in karate, Albert became a student of hand-to-hand combat. He made his professional MMA debut when he was 18 years old. Albert's coach is his father Khusein, who has a Master of Sports degree in boxing.

ProFC
Tumenov faced Kadzhik Abadzhyan on February 13, 2010. He won the back-and-forth fight via knockout in the first round. In second fight for the promotion, Tumenov faced powerful Armenian wrestler Vahe Tadevosyan on October 22, 2012 at ProFC - Union Nation Cup 9. Tumenov won the tough fight via unanimous decision. Tumenov faced Gocha Smoyan on January 22, 2011. He won the fight via split decision.

Ultimate Fighting Championship
In December 2013, Tumenov signed a four-fight contract with the UFC.

In his debut, Tumenov faced Ildemar Alcântara on February 15, 2014. at UFC Fight Night 36. He lost the fight via split decision.

Tumenov returned to the promotion on May 10, 2014 at UFC Fight Night 40 against Anthony Lapsley. He won the fight via KO in the first round.

For his third fight with the promotion, Tumenov faced Matt Dwyer on October 4, 2014 at UFC Fight Night: MacDonald vs. Saffiedine.  He won the fight via KO in the first round.

Tumenov faced Nico Musoke on January 24, 2015 at UFC on Fox 14. He won the fight by unanimous decision.

Tumenov was expected to face Héctor Urbina on June 13, 2015 at UFC 188. However, Urbina was injured and was replaced by UFC newcomer Andrew Todhunter.  Subsequently, the bout was then cancelled altogether on June 11 after Todhunter was medically disqualified from the card after dealing with issues while cutting weight.

Tumenov faced Alan Jouban on October 3, 2015 at UFC 192. He won the fight via knockout in the first round, which earned him his first Performance of the Night bonus.

Tumenov faced Lorenz Larkin on January 2, 2016 at UFC 195. He won the back-and-forth fight by split decision.

Tumenov next faced Gunnar Nelson on May 8, 2016 at UFC Fight Night 87. He lost the fight via submission in the second round.

Tumenov faced Leon Edwards on October 8, 2016 at UFC 204. He lost the fight via submission in the third round. This was Tumenov's last fight on his UFC contract and he declined to sign a new deal.

Absolute Championship Berkut
On 6 March, 2017 Tumenov signed a three-fight deal with the ACB.

Tumenov was tabbed as a short notice replacement for Marcelo Alfaya and faced Ismael de Jesus on May 20, 2017 at ACB 61. He won the fight via knockout in the first round.

Tumenov was expected to fight at ACB 80 on February 17, 2018 in Krasnodar, Russia against Mukhamed Berkhamov, but the latter got injured and was replaced by Nah-Shon Burrell. Tumenov won the fight by unanimous decision (30–27, 30–27, 30–27).

Tumenov fought Ciro Rodrigues for the welterweight championship at ACB 89 on September 8, 2018. Tumenov won the fight via technical knockout in the third round and claimed the championship.

After ACB and WFCA merged to become ACA, Tumenov claimed the ACA Welterweight Champion by defeating Murad Abdulaev via unanimous decision on April 27, 2019 at ACA 95: Tumenov vs. Abdulaev.

Tumenov defended the title facing Beslan Ushukov on November 29, 2019 at ACA 102: Tumenov vs. Ushukov. He won the bout via knockout in the second round.

After two years trying to sign with the UFC, Tumenov resigned with ACA.

In his ACA return, Tumenov faced Gadzhimurad Khiramagomedov on October 4, 2022 at ACA 146. He won the bout via unanimous decision.

Tumenov faced Altynbek Mamashov in the Quarterfinal of the 2023 ACA Welterweight Grand Prix on March 17, 2023 at ACA 154: Vakhaev vs Goncharov, winning the bout via unanimous decision.

Championships and accomplishments

Mixed Martial Arts
Ultimate Fighting Championship
Performance of the Night (One time) 
Absolute Championship Akhmat
ACA Welterweight Champion (One time)
One successful title defense
Absolute Championship Bekrut
ACB Welterweight Champion (One time; Final)
Sportbox.ru
Best Russian MMA fighter (2015).
Fight TV (Russia)
Best Russian MMA fighter (2015).

Boxing
Russian Federation of Boxing
Russian Kabardino-Balkaria Championships Medalist.
Russian National level in Boxing.

Hand-to-hand combat
Russian Union of Martial Arts
Russian National Hand-to-hand Gold Medalist (2009, 2013).

Personal life
Khusein Tumenov is the father of the mixed martial artist. He also has a younger sister known as Asiyat. His family comes from Balkar ethnic group and is Muslim. Tumenov's cousin is amateur world boxing champion Bibert Tumenov.

Mixed martial arts record

|-
|Win
|align=center|24–4
|Altynbek Mamashov
|Decision (unanimous)
|ACA 154: Vakhaev vs Goncharov
|
|align=center|5
|align=center|5:00
|Krasnodar, Russia
|
|-
|Win
|align=center|23–4
|Gadzhimurad Khiramagomedov	
|Decision (unanimous)
|ACA 146: Abdurahmanov vs. Pessoa
|
|align=center|5
|align=center|5:00
|Grozny, Russia
|
|-
|Win
|align=center|22–4
|Beslan Ushukov
|KO (punch) 
|ACA 102: Tumenov vs. Ushukov
|
|align=center|2
|align=center|3:12
|Almaty, Kazakhstan
|
|-
|Win
|align=center|21–4
|Murad Abdulaev
|Decision (unanimous)
|ACA 95: Tumenov vs. Abdulaev 
|
|align=center|3
|align=center|5:00
|Moscow, Russia
|
|- 
|Win
|align=center|20–4
|Ciro Rodrigues
|TKO (punches)
|ACB 89
|
|align=center|3
|align=center|4:48
|Krasnodar, Russia
|
|-
|Win
|align=center|19–4
|Nah-Shon Burrell
|Decision (unanimous)
|ACB 80: Tumenov vs. Burrell 
|
|align=center|3
|align=center|5:00
|Krasnodar, Russia
|
|-
|Win
|align=center|18–4
|Ismael de Jesus
|KO (punch)
|ACB 61: Balaev vs. Bataev 
|
|align=center|1
|align=center|0:46
|Saint Petersburg, Russia
|
|-
|Loss
|align=center|17–4
|Leon Edwards
|Submission (rear-naked choke)
||UFC 204
|
|align=center|3
|align=center|3:01
|Manchester, England
|
|-
|Loss
|align=center|17–3
|Gunnar Nelson
|Submission (neck crank)
|UFC Fight Night: Overeem vs. Arlovski
|
|align=center|2
|align=center|3:15
|Rotterdam, Netherlands
|
|-
|Win
|align=center|17–2
|Lorenz Larkin
|Decision (split) 
|UFC 195 
|
|align=center|3
|align=center|5:00
|Las Vegas, Nevada, United States
|
|-
|Win
|align=center|16–2
|Alan Jouban
|TKO (head kick and punches)
|UFC 192
|
|align=center|1
|align=center|2:55
|Houston, Texas, United States
|
|-
| Win
| align=center| 15–2
| Nico Musoke
| Decision (unanimous)
| UFC on Fox: Gustafsson vs. Johnson
| 
| align=center| 3
| align=center| 5:00
| Stockholm, Sweden
| 
|-
|Win
|align=center| 14–2
|Matt Dwyer
| KO (head kick and punch)
|UFC Fight Night: MacDonald vs. Saffiedine
|
|align=center|1
|align=center|1:03
|Halifax, Canada
|
|-
|Win
|align=center| 13–2
|Anthony Lapsley
| KO (punch)
|UFC Fight Night: Brown vs. Silva
|
|align=center| 1
|align=center| 3:56
|Cincinnati, Ohio, United States
|
|-
|Loss
|align=center| 12–2
|Ildemar Alcântara
|Decision (split)
|UFC Fight Night: Machida vs. Mousasi
|
|align=center|3
|align=center|5:00
|Jaraguá do Sul, Brazil
|
|-
|Win
|align=center| 12–1
|Yasubey Enomoto
|TKO (head kick and punches)
|Fight Nights - Battle of Moscow 13
|
|align=center|1
|align=center|3:52
|Moscow, Russia
|
|-
|Win
|align=center|11–1
|Roman Mironenko
|TKO (punches)
|Fight Nights - Battle of Moscow 12
|
|align=center|1
|align=center|2:43
|Moscow, Russia
|
|-
|Win
|align=center|10–1
|Viskhan Amirkhanov
|TKO (punches)
|Tech-Krep Fighting Championship - Southern Front
|
|align=center|1
|align=center|0:38
|Krasnodar, Russia
|
|-
|Win
|align=center|9–1
|Rasul Shovhalov
|TKO (punches)
|MMA South Russian Championship 
|
|align=center|1
|align=center|3:38
|Krasnodar, Russia
|
|-
|Win
|align=center|8–1
|Yuri Kozlov
|TKO (punches)
|MMA South Russian Championship
|
|align=center|1
|align=center|1:39
|Khabarovsk, Russia
|
|-
|Win
|align=center|7–1
|Ashamaz Kanukoev
|KO (punches)
|PRB FCF MMA - Russian Championship
|
|align=center|2
|align=center|2:05
|Nalchik, Russia
|
|-
|Win
|align=center|6–1
|Islam Dadilov
|TKO (punches)
|PRB FCF MMA - Russian Championship
|
|align=center|1
|align=center|2:37
|Gudermes, Russia
|
|-
|Win
|align=center|5–1
|Kazavat Suleymanov
|Decision (unanimous)
|PRB FCF MMA - Russian Championship
|
|align=center|3
|align=center|5:00
|Gudermes, Russia
|
|-
|Loss
|align=center|4–1
|Murad Abdulaev
|Decision (unanimous)
|FCF - CIS Pro Tournament
|
|align=center|2
|align=center|5:00
|Nalchik, Russia
|
|-
|Win
|align=center|4–0
|Gocha Smoyan
|Decision (split)
|ProFC - Union Nation Cup 12
|
|align=center|3
|align=center|5:00
|Tbilisi, Georgia
|
|-
|Win
|align=center|3–0
|Said Khalilov
|Decision (unanimous)
|ProFC - Union Nation Cup 11
|
|align=center|2
|align=center|5:00
|Babruysk, Belarus
|
|-
|Win
|align=center|2–0
|Vahe Tadevosyan
|Decision (unanimous)
|ProFC - Union Nation Cup 9
|
|align=center|2
|align=center|5:00
|Nalchik, Russia
|
|-
|Win
|align=center|1–0
|Kadzhik Abadzhyan
|TKO (punches) 
|ProFC - Union Nation Cup 5
|
|align=center|1
|align=center|2:02
|Nalchik, Russia
|

Professional boxing record

Filmography

See also
 List of current UFC fighters
 List of male mixed martial artists

References

External links 
 
 

Russian male mixed martial artists
Russian Muslims
Living people
1991 births
Russian expatriates in the United States
Welterweight mixed martial artists
Mixed martial artists utilizing ARB
Mixed martial artists utilizing karate
Mixed martial artists utilizing boxing
Russian male boxers
People from Kabardino-Balkaria
Ultimate Fighting Championship male fighters
Sportspeople from Kabardino-Balkaria